George Ives (January 19, 1926 – February 22, 2013) was an American character actor.

Career 
A native of New York City, Ives played Douglas Aldrich in the television series The Jim Backus Show, also known as Hot off the Wire. He starred in an episode of The King of Queens, an episode of The Andy Griffith Show entitled TV or Not TV, as well as an episode of The Office entitled "Phyllis' Wedding.” Ives also appeared as Lank Dailey, owner of Dailey's Motel and the Arena roadhouse in Hot Rods to Hell, the last film directed by John Brahm.

Personal life 
He died at his home in Brentwood, Los Angeles, California, in 2013 at the age of 87.

Filmography

Film

Television

References

External links

1926 births
2013 deaths
American male television actors
People from Brentwood, Los Angeles